Cercyon analis is a species of water scavenger beetle in the family Hydrophilidae. It is found in Australia, Europe and Northern Asia (excluding China), and North America.

References

Further reading

 

Hydrophilidae
Articles created by Qbugbot
Beetles described in 1798